Deadline is a British four-part mystery drama miniseries, aired on  Channel 5 during April 2022. A jaded journalist (James D'Arcy) becomes fascinated by an enigmatic young widow (Charlie Murphy), who is widely suspected of having killed her rich husband, and works to solve the case.

References

External links
 Official site
 

2022 British television series debuts
2022 British television series endings
2020s British drama television series
2020s British crime drama television series 
2020s British television miniseries
Channel 5 (British TV channel) original programming
English-language television shows